Bălăușeri is a commune in Mureș County, Transylvania, Romania. It is composed of six villages: Agrișteu, Bălăușeri, Chendu, Dumitreni, Filitelnic and Senereuș.

History 
Bălăușeri is a commune in Mureș County, Transylvania, Romania. It is composed of six villages: Agrișteu, Bălăușeri, Chendu, Dumitreni, Filitelnic and Senereuș. The village was in the northern reaches of Küküllő County in Transylvania, just over the border from the Székely Land; in the 1876 administrative reform, the county was split and thereafter the village belonged to Kis-Küküllő County in the Kingdom of Hungary. After the 1920 Treaty of Trianon, it became part of Romania along with the rest of Transylvania.

Demographics

According to the 2011 census, the commune had a population of 4,698, of which 3,195 (68.01%) were Hungarians, 905 (17.58%) Romanians, 662 (14.09%) Roma and 10 Germans. Bălăușeri village has a population of 1228 people.

See also 
 List of Hungarian exonyms (Mureș County)

References

Communes in Mureș County
Localities in Transylvania
Székely communities